Alfonso Hoggard (born April 17, 1989) is an American football wide receiver who is currently a free agent. He played college football at Clarion University.

College career
On November 11, 2009, he was named the PSAC West Offensive Player of the Year.

Professional career

Hoggard started the 2014 season with the Harrisburg Stampede, but was released after just two games with the team.

References

External links
Clarion Golden Eagles bio

Living people
1989 births
American football wide receivers
Clarion Golden Eagles football players
Lehigh Valley Steelhawks players
Philadelphia Soul players
Erie Explosion players
Harrisburg Stampede players
Players of American football from Pennsylvania